Srinivas Gada is an Oxford-based doctor, lecturer and academic. His work revolves around autism/ASD in children, Dyspraxia, Developmental Delay, Learning Disability, Emotional & Behavioural Disorders and Cerebral Palsy. Dr Gada has been teaching at University of Oxford. Dr Sri Gada is an Hon Senior Lecturer since 2007

Publications 

 The Oxford Specialist Handbook of Community Paediatrics
 Neurodevelopmental assessments of rare genetic conditions, published at Developmental Medicine and Child Neurology, 10 Jan 2020,  PMID 31925785 
 Improving mental health through parenting programmes: are the results valid?
 Tips on...How to be child friendly, November 2003,  BMJ 2003;327:0311418a

References 

Academics of the University of Oxford
Living people
Year of birth missing (living people)

National Health Service people
British paediatricians
Indian emigrants to the United Kingdom
Fellows of the Royal College of Paediatrics and Child Health
Fellows of the Royal Society of Medicine